John Worth (fl. 1413) was an English politician.

He was a Member (MP) of the Parliament of England for Chippenham in May 1413.

References

14th-century births
15th-century deaths
English MPs May 1413